The Cleveland mayoral election of 1973 saw the reelection of Ralph Perk.

This was the first Cleveland mayoral election to use a nonpartisan system.

Primary election

Candidates
James M. Carney, businessman and 1971 Democratic Party nominee for mayor
Ralph Perk, incumbent mayor
Joseph Pirincin, 1971 Socialist Labor Party nominee for mayor
Robbie Scherr

Results

General election
On October 11, James M. Carney withdrew from the race, citing "personal" reasons. Carney's campaign committee selected then-City Council Clerk Mercedes Cotner to replace him on the ballot.

Results

References

1970s in Cleveland
Cleveland mayoral
Cleveland
Mayoral elections in Cleveland
Non-partisan elections
November 1973 events in the United States